Kim Yoo-Hyun (Hangul: 김유현, Hanja: 金裕賢) is a former South Korean amateur boxer.

References

Living people
Boxers at the 1988 Summer Olympics
Olympic boxers of South Korea
Asian Games medalists in boxing
Boxers at the 1986 Asian Games
South Korean male boxers
Year of birth missing (living people)
Asian Games gold medalists for South Korea
Medalists at the 1986 Asian Games
Heavyweight boxers